= Karunya Healthcare Scheme =

Healthcare scheme in Kerala, India

Karunya HealthCare Scheme (Karunya Arogya Suraksha Padhathi) is a health insurance scheme introduced by the Government of Kerala to provide financial assistance for the treatment of serious diseases and medical conditions for individuals from economically weaker sections of society. The scheme, which was launched in 2019, is part of Kerala's comprehensive efforts to enhance healthcare accessibility and provide equitable healthcare for all its citizens. According to this scheme, a health cover of Rs. 5 lakhs per family per year is provided for secondary and tertiary care hospitalization to over 42 lakhs for poor and vulnerable families that form the bottom 40% of the Kerala population.

== Benefits ==
The Karunya scheme covers healthcare expenses such as medical consultation, intensive care services, diagnostic investigations, medical implantation services, hospital accommodation and post-hospitalization follow-up. There is an upper limit of annual cover of 5 lakhs for each eligible family. Furthermore, any eligible person suffering from any medical condition before being covered by the Karunya scheme will be able to get treatment for those medical conditions starting the day they were enrolled.

== Impact ==
As of 2023, 197 public and private hospitals are a part of this program and 42.5 lakh individuals are enrolled in this program. In 2022–23, the total expenditure under this program was 1629.72 crores.
